Dresser (formerly, Alston, Dresser Siding, and Merienda) is an unincorporated community in Alameda County, California. Its ZIP code is 94536 and its area codes are 510 and 341.

Geography and background 
The city's name was Merienda until 1915, and then was Alston until 1957. It was established as a station on the Southern Pacific Railroad in 1923 to serve the California Pressed Brick Company in Niles Canyon.

Current status 
Reportedly, the location has been used for partying since it was closed in the 1990s.  The adjacent "Secret Sidewalk" (Niles Canyon Aqueduct)  is also used for such purposes.

See also 
 Merienda, California
 Niles Canyon
 Niles Canyon Railway
 Sunol Water Temple

References

Notes

External links
 
 Sunol Aqueduct
 Photos of the brick factory: view 1, view 2, view 3
 Anecdotes of the Secret Sidewalk

Unincorporated communities in California
Unincorporated communities in Alameda County, California